Sainte-Honorine-la-Guillaume is a commune in the Orne department in north-western France.

History

 1620: Georges Pierre is the vicar of this parish.
 1622: Jean Le Corsonnois is curate and François Guérin "parish priest".
 1622: "Mr Guillaume Lesage, squire, gentleman of la Bocherie and of the Rocher de Sainte-Honorine(la Guillaume)". His son is Jacques Lesage.

Administration

Serge Clérembaux was mayor between 1971 and 2020. Pierre Madeline was elected mayor in 2020.

Demography

People linked with the commune
Petrus Guérin du Rocher (1731–1792), Jesuit
 Hans-Joachim Klein, a former German terrorist, who belonged to the Vienna commando in December 1975, was arrested at Sainte-Honorine in September 1998 where he had lived for several years. He was sentenced to nine years' imprisonment in Germany in January 2001 for the murder of an Iraqi security agent in 1975. He later benefitted from a pardon and returned to Sainte-Honorine-le-Guillaume.

See also
 Communes of the Orne department

References

Bibliography

Jean-François Miniac (preface by Alain Lambert), Les Grandes Affaires criminelles de l'Orne, Éditions de Borée, coll. « Les Grandes Affaires criminelles », Paris, 2008, 336 p.

Saintehonorinelaguillaume